May Cecelia Gutteridge,  (May 21, 1917 – February 26, 2002), one of Canada's early and most celebrated social workers, was born  in Gosport, Hampshire, England, the youngest of four children of Ernest and Polly Symonds. Raised in a devout Christian home, she married Arthur Gutteridge, a school teacher, during WW2 on March 23rd, 1940 dressed in her Women's Royal Naval Service uniform. The couple had three children, Sonia, Michael and Lance. They immigrated to Canada settling in Prairie River, Saskatchewan in 1955.

Even though May was a busy mother and housewife, while in Saskatchewan, she engaged in numerous community activities. She ran a Scouting group, did substitute teaching, developed a kindergarten, supervised a 4-H club, and reopened a school in this remote area for the small group of children who could not get schooling anywhere else.

The family moved to Vancouver, British Columbia in 1958 where she became a regular worshipper at St. James' Anglican Church in Vancouver's Downtown East Side (DTES). It was there, in one of the poorest neighbourhoods in Canada, where her unparalleled story of outreach and care for the homeless, the poor and forgotten started.

May began looking after seniors in the church's basement and then formed St. James Social Service Society in 1961, the Home Help program in 1962, and the first shelter for abused women in the Downtown Eastside named The East Ender's Society in 1965.

At the same time she organized free legal aid, the Gastown Workshop, a cheque administration program for social assistance clients and later residential housing for seniors (1983) and the first free-standing hospice in British Columbia (1990).

Her work has been formally acknowledged by being awarded the Order of Canada by being invested as a Member, and by receiving the BC Senior Citizen of the year Award, the Silver Eagle Feather Award, the Pioneer Award, an honorary Doctorate of Laws from Simon Fraser University, the Chinatown Lioness Club Ambassador Award, the Certificate of Merit and the Chinatown Rotary Club Award.

At the time of her death, St. James' Community Service Society (now called The Bloom Group Social 
Service Society) had become one of the largest social service agencies in Vancouver with 250 employees and an annual budget of $10 million. May Gutteridge never received an income for her many years of service.

References 

 Fowler, Robin Taped interviews with May in 1997-98
 Grove, Lyndon Pacific Pilgrims 1979
 Reeve Phyllis Every Good Gift Mitchell Press 1980 Vancouver BC
 The Synod of the Diocese of New Westminster
 St James' Archives
 St. James' Social Service Annual Reports
 Welbanks, Douglas P. From Lost to Found, The May Gutteridge Story Chateau Lane Publishing, 2010

1917 births
2002 deaths
People from Gosport
People from Vancouver
British emigrants to Canada
Canadian Anglicans
Canadian social workers
Members of the Order of Canada